Dirba Assembly constituency (Sl. No.: 100) is a Punjab Legislative Assembly constituency in Sangrur district, Punjab state, India.

Members of the Legislative Assembly

Election results

2022 
:

2017 results

References

External links
  

Assembly constituencies of Punjab, India
Sangrur district